Coppenhall railway station was a station on the Grand Junction Railway in Cheshire.

It opened in 1837, and closed in 1840. No substantive remains exist as of 2015.

References

 

Disused railway stations in Cheshire
Former London and North Western Railway stations
Railway stations in Great Britain closed in 1840
Railway stations in Great Britain opened in 1837